Monkey Business (stylized as Monkey Bu$iness) is the third studio album by Polish singer Margaret. It was released only in Poland. The album was made available to stream exclusively on Tidal on 29 May 2017. Its deluxe edition, with two additional tracks, was released exclusively to Empik on 1 June 2017. The album was officially released on 2 June 2017 by Extensive Music and Magic Records.

Monkey Businesss lead single, "What You Do", was released on 12 May 2017, followed by "Byle jak" ("Anyhow") on 21 December. It also includes the single "Blue Vibes", which was recorded for the Polish-language version of the 2017 animated feature film, Smurfs: The Lost Village, and did not promote the album.

Monkey Business peaked at number eight on Polish Albums Chart.

Track listing

Charts

Release history

References

2017 albums
Margaret (singer) albums